Eupithecia cocciferata is a moth in the family Geometridae. It is found on the Iberian Peninsula, in France, Italy, Croatia, North Macedonia and on Corsica and Sardinia, as well as in North Africa.

Gallery

References

External links

Lepiforum.de

Moths described in 1864
cocciferata
Moths of Europe
Moths of Africa
Taxa named by Pierre Millière